The Chinese Beijing Automobile Works, formerly Beijing Jeep, BJ212 (Chinese: 北京212) and BAW BJ2020 is a Land Rover and Jeep inspired four-wheel drive, originally a 2.4 L (2445 cc) four-cylinder gas-engine powered (four-cylinder diesel engines were added in the 2000s) light-duty offroad utility vehicle in the half tonne class. The original design, depending in large part on Russian off-roaders from UAZ and possibly developed in conjunction with the UAZ-469, debuted in 1965 as the Beijing BJ212. It has been known as the BJ2020 series since the Chinese car classification system was changed in 1989. For the BJ210 model, the manufacturing continued and was transferred to Tianjin's First Auto Works which took over manufacturing under the name of TJ210 C. Tianjin's First Auto Works also produce variants with two metal half-doors and an extended wheelbase version with four metal doors.

History
It is commonly used by the Chinese government (particularly the armed forces), but is also commercially available. Various versions of the Jeep are today sold under the names of Zhanqi, Jinxuanfeng, City Cruiser, Kuangchao, and Ludi. The BJ212 was expressly developed for use by the Chinese military as well as by lower-level cadres. Semi-legal copies were also built by Xinkai in Hebei, beginning in 1984. 

By the early 2000s, the Xinkai-built version was sold as the Lieying ("Falcon"), a copy of the Zhanqi four-door hardtop, equipped with the 2.2-liter GW491QE (a copy of the Toyota 4E engine, also built in Hebei by Great Wall).

Since 2012, the Beijing Automobile Works (北京汽车制造厂有限公司）has been producing the BJ212 and Zhanqi in Huanghua, Hebei（河北省黄骅市, equipped firstly with the 2.0 liter 4G20 engine (a copy of the Toyota 4Y engine, built by Brilliance Auto Xinchen XCE in Sichuan), then a turbocharged 1.5 liter Mitsubishi engine and a turbocharged 2.4 liter Mitsubishi engine (Built in Shenyang, Liaoning Province by Hangtian Mitsubishi, a joint venture of Mitsubishi and state owned Hangtian Group), because the 4G20 engine is unable to reach National VI Emission Standard.

Upgrades
 BJ2020: Upgraded chassis. Produced from 1986 to 2005. The vehicle is upgraded with BJ492 engine displacement of 2.45, 12 liters fuel per 100 kilometers.
 BJ2022: Upgraded chassis. Featuring more powerful engines and better transmissions.

Variants

BJ212
 BJ212 - (1964–1986) Standard five-seat version
 BJ212A - Long wheelbase eight-seat version
 BJ212F - BJ212A with a solid tent
 BJ212E - Designed in 1986. With a Perkins diesel engine and a new transmission. Also used on a Jeep Cherokee-engined prototype with 15-inch wheels built the same year.
 BJ 121 - (1980–1986) two-wheel drive pickup and derivatives
 BJ 1021 - (1986-201?) a renamed version of the long wheelbase 2WD BJ 121
 BJ 222 - (1980–1986) four-wheel drive pickup and derivatives, originally called the BJ 211. Replaced by the BJ2032 series
 BJ 2020 - (1986–2005) Upgraded with BJ492 engine displacement of 2.45, 12 liters fuel per 100 kilometers
 BJ2020N: BJ2020N, BJ2020NA, BJ2020NJ (military type), BJ2020NAJ (military type)
 BJ2020S: BJ2020S, BJ2020SA, BJ2020SAJ (military type), BJ2020SG, BJ2Q20SJ (military type), BJ2020ST
 BJ2020V "New City Cruiser": BJ2020VA, BJ2020VB, BJ2020VE, BJ2020VT (C498QA engine)
 BJ 2024 S "Jinxuanfeng" (2000-2001) redesigned with rectangular headlights and a Jeep Wrangler-like grille
 BJ 2023/2024 Z "Zhanqi" (2001-Present) similar, but less angular and with round headlights copied from Jeep CJ.
 BAW2033 Series "BJ212"（2020-Present）Fitted with a turbocharged 1.5 liter gasoline engine or a 2.4 liter gasoline engine manufactured by Hangtian Mitsubishi, which comply with National VI emission standard. The standard Version of the BAW2033 Series includes air conditioning and a restyled interior originated from BAW Yongshi (Gen 1).
 BJ 2032 (1986–2005) four-wheel drive long-wheelbase models, replacing the BJ 222
 BJ 2032 Z "Zhanqi" (2005-present) as BJ 2032 but redesigned on the Zhanqi lines

Military variants
 BJ212 HJ-8: HJ-8 ATGM mounted on BJ212 chassis.
 BJ2020 HJ-8: HJ-8 ATGM mounted on BJ2020SAJ chassis. It is used as a light and mobile fire support weapon platform by People's Liberation Army Ground Force.
 BJ2022: lightly armored vehicle upgrade of BJ2020.

Gallery

List of operators

See also
 BJ2022
 UAZ-469

References

BAW vehicles
Off-road vehicles
Military vehicles of the People's Republic of China
Military light utility vehicles
Mid-size sport utility vehicles
Military trucks of China
Pickup trucks